The Wirral by-election of 11 March 1976 was held after Selwyn Lloyd, who had been elected as a Conservative Member of Parliament (MP) but who was serving as Speaker of the House of Commons, retired.  The Conservatives held on to the seat in the by-election.

Results

References

Wirral by-election
Wirral by-election
1970s in Merseyside
Politics of the Metropolitan Borough of Wirral
By-elections to the Parliament of the United Kingdom in Merseyside constituencies
Wirral by-election